National Park Drentsche Aa is a national park of the Netherlands located in the province of Drenthe on the west side of the Hondsrug. It consists of the cultural landscape surrounding the valley of the small river the Drentsche Aa. The landscape is currently nearly the same as it was in the mid 19th century, as the several agricultural landscape reforms of the 20th century were not implemented in this area. Because of this, many hedges, heathlands and traditionally managed fields ('essen' in Dutch) were spared from transformation. The national park is part of the (three times) larger national landscape Drentsche Aa.

References

External links 
 
 Official website

Protected areas established in 2002
2002 establishments in the Netherlands
National parks of the Netherlands
Geography of Drenthe
Tourist attractions in Drenthe
Aa en Hunze